Creatonotos punctivitta is a moth of the family Erebidae. It was described by Francis Walker in 1855. It is found in the Democratic Republic of the Congo, Nigeria, South Africa, Sudan, Tanzania and Zambia.

References

Spilosomina
Moths described in 1855
Insects of the Democratic Republic of the Congo
Lepidoptera of West Africa
Insects of Tanzania
Fauna of Zambia
Moths of Africa